Frederick Southgate Taylor (December 16, 1847 – February 16, 1896), was a businessman, politician, philanthropist, and founder of Pi Kappa Alpha fraternity.

Biography
His father, the Honorable Tazewell Taylor, was the bursar of The College of William and Mary until his death in 1850.  Taylor grew up in and around Norfolk, Virginia.  Tradition states that he served in the Confederate Army, but no permanent record exists within his family.

After receiving his A.B. degree from William and Mary, Taylor entered the University of Virginia in the Autumn of 1867.  Taylor stayed at 47 West Range (part of The Range) until 1869, studying pre-law.

On Sunday evening March 1, 1868, at 47 West Range, Pi Kappa Alpha was founded by Frederick Southgate Taylor, his cousin and roommate Littleton Waller Tazewell Bradford, two of Tazewell's fellow Virginia Military Institute cadets then studying medicine at Virginia, James Benjamin Sclater Jr. and Julian Edward Wood, another medical student Robertson Howard, and finally business student William C. Alexander.  It is generally indicated and accepted that Taylor was the inspiration behind the founding of Pi Kappa Alpha.  He gave the fraternity its name and motto.

Upon graduation Taylor continued to study law but never practiced it as a profession.  He devoted himself primarily to commercial enterprises and politics, amassing a small fortune through real estate.  He married Anna Brooke; they had a daughter and four sons.

Taylor represented Norfolk as a Democratic member of the Virginia House of Delegates for two separate terms, 1874–1875 and 1890–1891.

Taylor also served as President of the Common Council of Norfolk, a position similar to the office of mayor.  Always thought of as an outstanding philanthropist and citizen, Taylor made this reputation through using his fortune generously for community service initiatives.

On February 16, 1896, Taylor dropped dead on the streets of Norfolk while talking with an associate.  Taylor was forty-eight years old, and most of his children were still young. Taylor was buried in Elmwood Cemetery in Norfolk along with his cousin and fellow founder Littleton Waller Tazewell Bradford.

A Norfolk newspaper wrote the following upon Taylor's death: 
"quiet and unostentatious in his manner" whose "friends appreciate his true worth, while the city at large felt the benefits of his interest at all times and all circumstances."  He was called a "gentleman in every sense of the word" and characterized as "devotedly attached to his wife and family."  His business associates esteemed him for "his earnest character, his intelligence, and faithfulness to duty" and they saw in him a man "whose services in public offices were distinguished by zeal, integrity, and success, while his private life was adorned by the highest social virtues."

Notes

References
Hart and Blount. (Pi Kappa Alpha Fraternity 1968). A History of Pi Kappa Alpha. Press of Democrat Printing & Litho Company, Little Rock, Ark.

External links

1847 births
1896 deaths
Politicians from Norfolk, Virginia
Members of the Virginia House of Delegates
College of William & Mary alumni
University of Virginia School of Law alumni
Pi Kappa Alpha founders
19th-century American politicians